Timeline of New Zealand may refer to:
Timeline of New Zealand history
Timeline of the New Zealand environment
Timeline of New Zealand's links with Antarctica

See also
History of New Zealand
:Category:Years in New Zealand
List of timelines